Audley Kendrick Tuten (January 14, 1914 – May 7, 1994) was an American-born Canadian professional ice hockey player who played 39 games in the National Hockey League. He was born in Enterprise, Alabama, but was raised in Saltcoats, Saskatchewan. Tuten played for the Chicago Blackhawks in the 1941–42 and 1942–43 seasons.

External links

1914 births
1994 deaths
American emigrants to Canada
Baltimore Orioles (ice hockey) players
Canadian ice hockey defencemen
Chicago Blackhawks players
Oakland Oaks (PCHL) players
Ice hockey people from Saskatchewan
People from Saltcoats, Saskatchewan